Seymour Lake is a spring-fed lake located in Morgan, Vermont, which is located in the Northeast Kingdom of Vermont. The lake is on a tributary of the Clyde River in Orleans County, Vermont. The elevation is 1278 feet. 

The closest major airport is located in Burlington, Vermont, located approximately 101 miles away.

Environment
Historically the lake had a population of Rainbow smelt, which is absent as of 2021.

Phosphorous levels had been increasing in the lake, but are now kept stable.

References

 

Lakes of Vermont
Lakes of Orleans County, Vermont